Needing You may refer to:

 "Needing You" (song), by Kevin Borg, 2013
 Needing You..., a 2000 film

See also

"Needin' U", a 1998 song by David Morales Presents The Face